Zombie Chronicles, also known as The Zombie Chronicles and Zombie Chronicles: 3D, is a 2001 horror film directed by Brad Sykes. It follows Tara Woodley, a reporter who visits an old desert town to research her article on the ghost town legends from around there. On the way she picks up the hitchhiker, Ebenezer Jackson, who takes her to an abandoned building where she interviews him via tape recorder.

Premise
Zombies rise and attack the living. Tara interviews a hitchhiker in an abandoned building. He tells her a story. Ebenezer then proceeds to tell her another story.

Cast
 Emmy Smith as Tara Woodley
 Joe Haggerty as Ebenezer Jackson
 Garret Clancy as Sgt. Ben Draper
 Greg Brown as Pvt. Wilson
 Mike Coen as Jason
 John Kyle Grady as Buzz
 Janet Tracy Keijser as Melinda
 Beverly Lynne as Marsh
 Jarrod Robbins as Geeter

Home media
Zombie Chronicles was released on DVD. One DVD release includes the film in both regular 2D and in stereoscopic 3D.

References

Bibliography

External links
 

2001 films
2001 horror films
American zombie films
2001 3D films
2000s English-language films
Films directed by Brad Sykes
2000s American films